Nour Aboulmakarim (born 18 February 2003 in Cairo) is an Egyptian professional squash player. As of April 2022, she was ranked number 55 in the world.

See also 
Official Women's Squash World Ranking

References

2003 births
Living people
Egyptian female squash players
Sportspeople from Cairo
21st-century Egyptian women